Christophe Ridley (born 16 April 1993) is an English rugby referee.

Career

Previously a student at the University of Gloucestershire, Ridley began refereeing professionally in 2016. He has been a regular referee in Premiership Rugby and has also refereed in the European Rugby Champions Cup and EPCR Challenge Cup.

References

Living people
1993 births
English rugby union referees
United Rugby Championship referees
People from Paris
Alumni of the University of Gloucestershire